Yerevan railway station is the central station of Yerevan, the capital of Armenia, located south of downtown Yerevan, approximately 2.8 km from Republic Square.

It is connected to the adjacent David of Sasun metro station by a pedestrian tunnel.

History
In 1902, the first railway line was built to Yerevan, connecting it with Alexandropol (Gyumri) and Tiflis (Tbilisi). In 1908, a second line connected it with Julfa, Persia.

The station building was built in 1956. The Museum of railway transport of Armenia was opened in the station on 31 July 2009. A preserved steam locomotive, number 3ա705-46, stands in the station.

In 2010, Russian Railways rebuilt the station complex. During the renovations, they restored the interior of the station, introducing LCD screens with train schedule information for passengers. In addition, due to the significant increase in passenger traffic, as well as the need to ensure a comfortable environment when buying tickets, it was decided to divide the space into rooms for long-distance and international trains. The design of the rooms did not disturb the overall architectural style; decoration is made of natural and artificial materials identical to the original. In the station building, there is a hotel with rooms for accommodation.

Trips
 Yerevan — Batumi (from June to September)
 Yerevan — Tbilisi (from December to March)
 Yerevan — Gyumri
 Yerevan — Ararat
 Yerevan — Araks
 Yerevan — Yeraskh

Photos

See also
List of railway stations in Armenia
Transport in Armenia
Rail transport in Europe

References

External links

 Photos of Yerevan station

Railway stations in Armenia
Railway stations opened in 1902